Giuseppe Nicolini may refer to:

 Giuseppe Nicolini (composer) (1762–1842), Italian composer
 Giuseppe Placido Nicolini (1877–1973), Roman Catholic bishop
 Giuseppe Nicolini (writer) (1788–1855), Italian poet, literary critic and politician
 Giuseppe Nicolini (sculptor) (1855–?), Italian sculptor